The district of Neelum (spelt also Neelam) is the northernmost of 10 districts located within the Pakistani-administered territory of Azad Kashmir. Taking up the larger part of the Neelam Valley, the district has a population of around  people (as of 2017). It was among the worst-hit areas of Pakistan during the 2005 Kashmir earthquake.

Location 
The district is bordered on the north and north-east by the Diamer District, the Astore District, and the Skardu District of Gilgit-Baltistan, on the south by the Kupwara District and the Bandipora District of Indian-administered Jammu and Kashmir, on the south-west by the Muzaffarabad District, and by the west by the Mansehra District of Pakistan's Khyber Pakhtunkhwa Province.

The Neelum Valley was known before the partition as Kishanganga and was subsequently renamed for the village of Neelam. It flows from the Gurez Valley in Indian-administered Jammu and Kashmir and roughly follows first a western and then a south-western course until it joins the Jhelum River at Muzaffarabad. The Line of Control runs through the valley, either across the mountains to the south-east or in places right along the river, with several villages on the left bank falling on the Indian side of the border.

Administration

The Neelum District was part of the Muzaffarabad District until 2005. It is made up of two tehsils: the Athmuqam Tehsil, in which the district headquarters is located, and the Sharda Tehsil.
The Neelum District is the largest district of Azad Kashmir by area. The valley extends for approximately 200 kilometers along the Neelum River.
This is a generally poor region, reliant on subsistence agriculture and handicrafts, with tourism growing in importance in recent years.
According to the Alif Ailaan Pakistan District Education Rankings 2015, The Neelum District is ranked 33 out of 148 districts in terms of education. For facilities and infrastructure, the district is ranked 136 out of 149. The Neelum Valley has opportunities for everyone, including hiking, fishing, white-water rafting, and kayaking.

Languages
Several languages are spoken natively in the district. The predominant one is Hindko. It is the language of wider communication in the area and is spoken at a native or near-native level by almost all members of the other language communities, many of whom are abandoning their language and shifting to Hindko. This language is usually called Parmi (or Parimi, Pārim), a name that likely originated in the Kashmiri word  'from the other side', which was the term used by the Kashmiris of the Vale of Kashmir to refer to the highlanders, who spoke this language. The language is also sometimes known as Pahari, although it bears a closer resemblance to the Hindko of neighbouring Kaghan Valley than to the Pahari spoken in the Murree Hills. Unlike other varieties of Hindko, Pahari or Punjabi, it has preserved the voiced aspirated consonants at the start of the word: for example, gha 'grass' vs.  Punjabi kà, where the aspiration and voicing have been lost giving rise to a low tone on the following vowel. This sound change however, is currently spreading here as well, but it has so far only affected the villages situated along the Neelam highway. This variety of Hindko is also spoken in nearby areas of India-administered Kashmir. Since Partition, the language varieties on either side of the Line of Control have diverged in a number of ways. For example, in the Neelam Valley, there is a higher proportion of Urdu loanwords, while the variety spoken across the Line of Control has retained more traditional Hindko words.

The second most widely spoken language of the Neelam Valley is Kashmiri. It is the majority language in at least a dozen or so villages, and in about half of these, it is the sole mother tongue. It is closer to the variety spoken in northern Kashmir (particularly in Kupwara District) than to the Kashmiri of the city of Muzaffarabad.

The third-largest ethnic, though not linguistic, group are the Gujjars, whose villages are scattered throughout the valley. Most of them have switched to Hindko, but a few communities continue using the Gujari language at home. Gujari is more consistently maintained among the Bakarwal, who travel into the valley (and beyond, into Gilgit-Baltistan) with their herds in the summer and who spend the winters in the lower parts of Azad Kashmir and in Punjab.

In the upper end of the valley, there are two distinct communities speaking two different varieties of Shina (locally sometimes called Dardi). One of them is found at Taobutt and the nearby village of Karimabad (formerly known as Sutti) near the border with India. Its speakers claim that their variety of Shina is close to the one spoken further up the valley in Indian Gurez. The Shina people of Phullwei claim to have originally come from Nait near Chilas in Gilgit-Baltistan.

A Pashto dialect is spoken in two villages (Dhaki and Changnar) that are situated on the Line of Control. Because of cross-border firing since the early 1990s, there has been large-scale migration away from these villages. The local dialect is not completely intelligible with the ones spoken in the rest of Pakistan.

One language that is unique to the Neelum Valley is the endangered Kundal Shahi. It is spoken by some of the inhabitants of the Kundal Shahi village near Athmuqam.

Additionally, Urdu is spoken by the formally educated and, like English, is used as a medium of instruction in schools.

Education 
According to Pakistan District Education Ranking 2017, a report released by Alif Ailaan, the district of Neelum stands at number 58 nationally in the ranking related to education, with an education score of 60.87. The Neelum District is lowest-ranked district in all of Azad Kashmir.

See also 

 Hunza Valley
Naltar Valley
 Kaghan Valley
 Swat Valley
 Kalasha Valleys
 Kumrat Valley
 Sharada Peeth
 Dosut

References

Bibliography

External links 
Neelum Valley-AJ&K Tourism & Archaeology Department
Neelum Valley-AJ&K Community Website

Districts of Azad Kashmir
2005 Kashmir earthquake
Valleys of Azad Kashmir